Filipina singer and actress Lea Salonga has received numerous accolades and honors around the world throughout her career. She has received at least 42 nominations, 27 wins, 16 cultural honors, 3 state honors, and 1 world record.

In 1991, she became the first Asian actress to win a Tony Award for her performance as Kim in the original Broadway production of Miss Saigon, following her win at the 1990 Laurence Olivier Awards for the same role. She has become one of the most awarded performers at the Aliw Awards with 16 nominations and 14 wins, including 3 consecutive wins for Best Child Performer. In 2005, she was awarded the Golden Artist Award at the FAMAS Awards. She has received 2 Grammy nominations for Best Musical Theater Album (2003 and 2019).

In 1990, Salonga was awarded the Presidential Medal of Merit from President Corazon Aquino for her services to the arts. In 2007, President Gloria Arroyo honored Salonga with the rank of Commander of the Order of Lakandula in recognition of using her talents to benefit Philippine society and foster cultural exchange. The House of Representatives of the Philippines also awarded her with the Congressional Medal of Achievement for showing "the extent and depth of the Filipino musical talent" and "opening the way for other Filipino artists to break into the finest theaters in the world."

Awards and nominations

Other accolades

Cultural honors

State honors

World records

Notes

References 

Awards
Lists of awards received by Filipino musician
Lists of awards received by Filipino actor